Ray Gallagher (April 17, 1885 – March 6, 1953) was an American actor of the silent era. He appeared in more than 90 films between 1912 and 1936. He appeared in many productions at Universal. He was born in San Francisco, California and died in Camarillo, California from a heart attack.

Partial filmography
 The Prisoner's Story (1912)
 Judgment of the Sea (1912)
 Her Boy (1913)
 Her Life's Story (1914)
 Maid of the Mist (1915)
 The Grind (1915)
 Wanted: A Leading Lady (1915)
 The Trail of '98 (1928)
 Half a Bride (1928)
 Sinners' Holiday (1930)
 Song of the Trail (1936)
 Desert Guns (1936)

References

External links

1885 births
1953 deaths
American male film actors
American male silent film actors
Male actors from San Francisco
People from Greater Los Angeles
People from Camarillo, California
20th-century American male actors